Admiral Sir William Edmonstone, 4th Baronet CB, DL (29 January 1810 – 18 February 1888), also 14th of Duntreath, was a Scottish naval commander, courtier and Conservative politician.

Life
Born at Hampton, Edmonstone joined the Royal Navy in his teenage years, serving as a midshipman on the frigate HMS Sybelle and was subsequently was promoted Commodore. On return from naval service off West Africa he was made an Aide-de-Camp to Queen Victoria and appointed a Companion of the Order of the Bath (CB). He went on to serve with the rank of Captain as Superintendent of Woolwich Dockyard.  He was promoted Rear-Admiral on 3 July 1869, the day before he retired from the Royal Navy, a common practice at that time. He was elected Member of Parliament for Stirlingshire from 1874 to 1880. During this time he stayed at the family seat Duntreath Castle, Blanefield, Stirlingshire.

Sir William Edmonstone died at home, 11 Ainslie Place on the Moray Estate in Edinburgh on 18 February 1888, and was succeeded in the Edmonstone baronetcy by his only surviving son, Archibald Edmonstone. Lady Edmonstone died at Cramond House north-west of Edinburgh, on 11 August 1902.

Family

Edmonstone married at Zakynthos, Greece, on 13 July 1841, Mary Elizabeth Parsons (Newburn, Fife, 21 June 1823 – Cramond House, Midlothian, 11 August 1902), daughter of Lieutenant-Colonel Parsons, CMG, who was British Resident on the island of Zante, at a time when the Ionian Islands were a British Protectorate. Mary Elizabeth and Sir William in all had eleven children, nine of whom survived into adulthood:
 Mary Emma Frances (1842–1847), died when she was five
 Archibald Edmonstone, died in infancy; their second son (see below) bore the same name.
 Jessie Edmondstone ( b.1848, m. 1884 Major Edward John Winnington-Ingram (d.1892).  d. 10 June 1937)
 Louisa Ann Edmonstone (b. 1844 m.1872 Major General Henry Pipon CB, Governor of the Tower of London d. 1921)  . 
 Charlotte Henrietta Edmonstone (d. 21 October 1931), married in 1866 John Francis Kitson.
 Frances Euphemia Edmonstone (b. 1850, m.1873 Alexander Robert Duncan of Parkhill, Angus, factor of Duntreath. d. 14 February 1921)
 Sophia Edmonstone ( b. 1852, m. 1880 James Edward Hope of Belmont, Midlothian. d. 19 February 1924)
 Susanna Emily Edmonstone ( b. 1855, m.1885 Jonathan Bucknill. d. 9 May 1886)
 Mary Clementina Edmondstone (b.1857 m 1874 Andrew Graham Murray, Viscount Dunedin. d. 2 December 1922) 
 Sir Archibald Edmonstone of Duntreath, 5th Bt. (30 May 1867 – 1 April 1954)
 Alice Frederica Edmonstone (b.29 April 1868 m 1 June 1891 Lt Col George Keppel. d, 11 September 1947), a British socialite and one of the many mistresses of Edward VII of the United Kingdom; her great-granddaughter, Queen Camilla (née Shand, born 17 July 1947), was the mistress of and now second wife of Charles III.

See also

Notes

References
www.edmonstone.com

External links 
 

1810 births
1888 deaths
Baronets in the Baronetage of Great Britain
Members of the Parliament of the United Kingdom for Scottish constituencies
Royal Navy admirals
UK MPs 1874–1880
William
Members of the Parliament of the United Kingdom for Stirling constituencies
Deputy Lieutenants in Scotland